Hadrian Maria Netto (1885–1947) was a German stage and film actor. He was also a playwright.

Selected filmography
 A Woman for 24 Hours (1925)
 Destiny (1925)
 The Armoured Vault (1926)
 Love in the Cowshed (1928)
 There Is a Woman Who Never Forgets You (1930)
 Fire in the Opera House (1930)
 The Trunks of Mr. O.F. (1931)
 24 Hours in the Life of a Woman (1931)
 Under False Flag (1932)
 The Testament of Dr. Mabuse (1933)
 Just Once a Great Lady (1934)
 The Two Seals (1934)
 Love Conquers All (1934)
 Gypsy Blood (1934)
 Land of Love (1937)
 My Son the Minister (1937)
 The Secret Lie (1938)
 Dance on the Volcano (1938)
 Target in the Clouds (1939)
 Bel Ami (1939)
 Woman Made to Measure (1940)
 Diesel (1942)
 The Eternal Tone (1943)
 The Court Concert (1948)

References

Bibliography 
 Giesen, Rolf.  Nazi Propaganda Films: A History and Filmography. McFarland, 2003.

External links 
 

1885 births
1947 deaths
Actors from Leipzig
German male film actors
German male stage actors